Parajotus refulgens is a jumping spider species in the genus Parajotus that lives in Botswana, Democratic Republic of the Congo, Nigeria and Zimbabwe. The species was first identified by Wanda Wesołowska in 2000.

References

Salticidae
Spiders of Africa
Arthropods of Botswana
Arthropods of the Democratic Republic of the Congo
Fauna of Nigeria
Arthropods of Zimbabwe
Spiders described in 2000
Taxa named by Wanda Wesołowska